Sabinus  can also refer to:

Ancient Romans
 Sabinus (Ovid) (died AD 14 or 15), Roman poet, known friend of Ovid
 Appius Claudius Sabinus Regillensis, founder of the Claudian family
 Masurius Sabinus, Roman jurist who lived during the reign of Tiberius (Tiberius reigned 14-37 AD)
 Titus Flavius Sabinus (disambiguation), several people
 Quintus Titurius Sabinus (died 54 BC), legate under Julius Caesar
 Gaius Poppaeus Sabinus, consul in AD 9
 Julius Sabinus, Romanised Gaul who rebelled against Rome, living around AD 69
 Gaius Valarius Sabinus, Roman finance minister around AD 271
 Sabinus of Heraclea, 4th-century historian

Saints
 Sabinus of Spoleto (d. 304), Roman martyr 
 Sabinus of Hermopolis, Christian martyr of Egypt
 Sabinus of Canosa (461-566), bishop of Canosa in Italy
 Sabinus of Piacenza (333-420), bishop of Piacenza in Italy

Other uses
 Angelus Sabinus (15th century), Italian Renaissance poet and classical philologist
 Georg Sabinus (1508–1560), first rector of University of Königsberg
 Sabinus (opera), a 1773 opera by Gossec

See also 

 
 Sabines, a tribe in Latium predating the Roman Republic